Cape Obelisk is a cape at the north side of the entrance to Rohss Bay, on the west side of James Ross Island. Discovered and named by the Swedish Antarctic Expedition, 1901–04, under Nordenskjöld. The name is descriptive of a conspicuous rock pinnacle about 2 nautical miles (3.7 km) within the headland, which is visible from northwestward and southward.

See also
Obelisk Col

References

Headlands of James Ross Island